Nāṣīf bin ʻAbd Allāh bin Nāṣīf bin Janbulāṭ bin Saʻd al-Yāzijī (March 25, 1800 – February 8, 1871) was a Lebanese author at the times of the Ottoman Empire and father of Ibrahim al-Yaziji. He was one of the leading figures in the Nahda movement.

Like several of the principal players of the Arab Awakening (Nahda), Nasif al-Yaziji migrated from a Mount Lebanon ravaged by discord and revolt, to Beirut at a time when the city was undergoing rapid development and establishing itself as a centre of academia and journalism.

A Greek Catholic, he began his career as a private secretary (mudabbir) - a common way for Christians to attain social mobility under the restrictive iqta' system by which Mount Lebanon, which he described as "a country of tribes", was governed.

First employed by Prince Haydar al-Shihabi, he went on to work for Bashir Shihab II, whose brutal repression of his opponents earned him the title the "Red Emir".

When Yaziji moved to Beirut in 1840, he became an Arabic tutor and it was in this role that he came into contact with American and British Protestant missionaries. He would help fulfil one of the greatest ambitions of the missionaries – conduct a Protestant translation of the Bible into Arabic – when he corrected a translation that Eli Smith, an American missionary, and Butrus al-Bustani started in 1847.

After that, he taught at the Syrian Protestant College (later renamed the American University of Beirut) and wrote on poetry, rhetoric, grammar and philosophy. It was for his attempts to emulate the style of classical Arab writers, thereby rediscovering the literary heritage of the Arabs, that he is best known.

Among his works are a treatise on the muqata 'ji system. Used by the Ottomans to govern the emirate of Mount Lebanon, this involved tax-farming or iqta' rights being given to leading local families. These families enjoyed a degree of autonomy in the running of their region, controlled the land, collected taxes and benefitted from tax exemptions and benefits in exchange for providing the central authorities in Istanbul with revenue and armed men.

With Bustani and Mikhail Mishaqa, al-Yaziji formed the Syrian Association for the Sciences and Arts – the Arab world's first literary society – in 1847. The circle tackled and published its deliberations on themes such as women's rights, history and their fight against superstition.

It was dissolved in 1852 but its inner circle went on to establish the Syrian Scientific Association a few years later. This became a much larger, multi-sectarian society of intellectuals who pushed for Arab independence from the Ottomans.

References

Bibliography

19th-century writers from the Ottoman Empire
1800 births
1871 deaths
Lebanese Melkite Greek Catholics
Arabs from the Ottoman Empire